The Phantom Corsair is a prototype automobile built in 1938. It is a six-passenger 2-door sedan that was designed by Rust Heinz of the H. J. Heinz family and Maurice Schwartz of the Bohman & Schwartz coachbuilding company in Pasadena, California. Although sometimes dismissed as a failure because it never entered production, the Corsair is regarded as ahead of its time because of its futuristic features, and styling cues such as faired-in fenders and a low profile.

Design 
The Phantom Corsair's steel-and-aluminum body measured just  in height and incorporated fully skirted wheels and completely flush fenders while forgoing running boards. The car also lacked door handles, as the doors were instead opened electrically using push-buttons located on the exterior and the instrument panel. The instrument panel also featured a compass and altimeter, while a separate console above the windshield indicated when a door was ajar or if the car's lights or radio were turned on. The Corsair's body was mated to the "most advanced chassis available in the United States" at that time, the Cord 810. The Lycoming 80º V-8 engine-powered Cord chassis also featured front-wheel drive and an electrically operated four-speed pre-selector gearbox, as well as fully independent suspension and adjustable shock absorbers. Though these features from the Cord 810 chassis were all retained on the Phantom Corsair, the chassis was modified in order to accommodate the Corsair's large body. The back seats could only hold two passengers, however, in large part because of space limitations posed by on-board beverage cabinets. Though weighing a hefty , the Phantom Corsair could achieve speeds of up to  because of its modified, naturally aspirated 125 bhp Lycoming engine as well as its aerodynamic shape.

Production 
Rust Heinz planned to put the Phantom Corsair, which cost approximately $24,000 to produce in 1938 (equivalent to about $370,000 in 2010), into limited production at an estimated selling price of $12,500. However, Heinz's death in a car accident in July 1939 ended those plans, leaving the prototype Corsair as the only one ever built.

The Phantom Corsair now resides in the National Automobile Museum (also known as The Harrah Collection) in Reno, Nevada.

Media appearances 
 The automobile was featured as the "Flying Wombat" in the David O. Selznick film The Young in Heart (1938), starring Janet Gaynor, Douglas Fairbanks, Jr., Paulette Goddard, and Billie Burke.
 The Corsair was featured in a segment of the Popular Science film series in 1938.
 Versions of the Corsair (referred to as the "Manta") feature as unique unlockable vehicles in the 2002 video game Mafia and its 2020 remake.
 The Corsair is one of the 15 rare drivable vehicles featured in the 2011 video game L.A. Noire.

Image gallery

Notes

References

External links 

 Website of Popular Science films including Phantom Corsair segment

Concept cars